The Martyrs of Tlaxcala were three Mexican Roman Catholic teenagers from the state of Tlaxcala: Cristobal (1514/15–1527) and the two companions Antonio (1516/17–1529) and Juan (1516/17–1529). The three teenagers were converts from the indigenous traditions of their families to the Roman Catholic faith and received their educations from the Order of Friars Minor who baptized them and evangelized in the area. Their activism and evangelical zeal led to their deaths at the hands of those who detested their newfound faith and perceived them as dangers to their values and rituals.

The teenagers were beatified in Mexico in mid-1990 by Pope John Paul II.  Pope Francis – on 23 March 2017 – issued a decree that the three teenagers would be canonized without having a miracle attributed to their intercession as is the norm. The teenagers were canonized as saints on 15 October 2017.

Life

The primary source for the life of the Tlaxcalan Child Martyrs is Toribio Benavente Motolinia who described their life in 1539, with later texts in Nahuatl by Juan Bautista.

Cristobal
Cristobal was born either in 1514 or in 1515 as the son to an indigenous leader. He was considered the heir of his father Acxotécatl. He had three brothers: Bernardino and Luis in addition to one whose name is unknown. His mother was Tlapaxilotzin – she was Acxotécatl's first wife before the latter married Xochipapalotzin.

He converted to Roman Catholicism and received his education in Tlaxcala from the Order of Friars Minor – at their first school – who baptized him and instilled in him deep religious values and practices. The Franciscan brother Motolinia often called him "Cristobalito" – translated as "little Christopher." His father did not want to send Cristobal – his favorite son – to the Franciscan school but was convinced to do so when the Franciscans and Cristobal's brothers persuaded him to do so.

His father did not give much importance to Cristobal's spirit of evangelism – which was constant and persuasive – but could tolerate it no longer when his son starting breaking indigenous religious symbols in their home. He first forgave Cristobal but grew infuriated and planned to murder him. His stepmother also did not like his evangelism and pressured her husband to do something drastic to stop it.

Acxotécatl planned a feast for the household and ordered all his sons to be present before sending them – at one point – out of the room to be with Cristobal alone. His father grabbed his hair and dragged him along the floor and kicked him. He horsewhipped him with a thick holm oak club until his son's arms and legs were broken which caused profuse bleeding. It became clear to him that Cristobal would not renounce his faith and revert to the indigenous values, so he took Cristobal and burned him over a bonfire. Cristobal died the next morning from his grievous injuries in 1527 after calling out to his father and expressing his forgiveness. Acxotécatl also killed Cristobal's mother when she tried in vain to defend her son.

His father buried his remains in a room of the house where it might not be discovered but he was soon apprehended for the murder and the Spaniards sentenced him to death for the crime. In 1528 the Franciscan friar Andrea found his remains and had them exhumed for formal interment elsewhere.

Antonio and Juan
Antonio was born either in 1516 or in 1517 as the grandson of the noble Xiochténacti and was considered his heir being the first grandson. He converted to the Roman Catholic faith and began to detest the native rituals of the indigenous peoples including his own. Antonio served as an able interpreter for the Franciscans in the area. Antonio and his servant Juan were caught desecrating indigenous religious effigies and were murdered in 1529 when the locals caught them. Antonio came out of the room to find Juan dead and asked the attackers the reason Juan was targeted and not Antonio – the teen admitted he was the one desecrating the effigies and died when the attackers in turn attacked him.

Juan was born either in 1516 or in 1517 and was of humble origins; he too converted to Roman Catholicism and worked as Antonio's servant. Juan died alongside Antonio in 1529 and died as soon as the club struck him.

The bodies of both teenagers were thrown off a cliff but the Dominican friar Bernardino recovered them and moved them to Tepeaca to be interred.

Canonization
The beatification process opened under Pope John Paul II on 7 January 1982 after the Congregation for the Causes of Saints issued the official "nihil obstat" to the cause and titled the three teenagers as Servants of God. A cognitional process was held in the Diocese of Tlaxcala that Bishop Luis Munive Escobar oversaw; the C.C.S. later validated this process on 8 November 1985 and historians approved the cause on 8 November 1985 after deeming no historical obstacles existed to impede the cause.

The postulation sent the Positio dossier to the C.C.S. in 1989 which allowed for theologians to approve its contents on 24 November 1989 and the C.C.S. to do so as well on 6 February 1990. Pope John Paul II – on 3 March 1990 – confirmed that the three teenagers were killed "in odium fidei" (in hatred of the faith) and beatified them on 6 May 1990 on his apostolic visit to Mexico in the capital of Mexico City.

It had been reported that the three teenagers could be proclaimed as saints either in 2017 or in 2018 since the cause was in its "advantaged stages" according to Cardinal Angelo Amato in a meeting with the postulation. The cardinal also expressed that Pope Francis was monitoring the cause and had expressed his own closeness to this particular cause. The 30 C.C.S. members met to approve the cause on 14 March 2017 before passing it to the pope for approval; Pope Francis approved the canonization without the required miracle on 23 March 2017 thus confirming the three teenagers would be canonized. The date was formalized at a gathering of cardinals on 20 April and the children were canonized as saints on 15 October 2017.

The postulator for the cause at the time of their canonization was the Franciscan Giovangiuseppe Califano.

References

External links
Hagiography Circle
Saints SQPN

Year of birth unknown
1517 deaths
1529 deaths
16th-century Christian saints
16th-century Mexican people
16th-century Roman Catholic martyrs
16th-century venerated Christians
Beatifications by Pope John Paul II
Canonizations by Pope Francis
Catholic martyrs
Converts to Roman Catholicism from pagan religions
Filicides
Indigenous Roman Catholic saints of the Americas
Lists of Mexican people
Martyred groups
Mexican Roman Catholic saints
Murdered Mexican children
People executed by blunt trauma
People executed by burning
People murdered in Mexico
Venerated Catholics
Victims of anti-Catholic violence in Mexico
Violent deaths in Mexico